Arnolds Ūdris (born 18 June 1968) is a Latvian former cyclist. He competed in two events at the 1992 Summer Olympics.

References

External links
 

1968 births
Living people
Latvian male cyclists
Olympic cyclists of Latvia
Cyclists at the 1992 Summer Olympics
Sportspeople from Riga